The 2001 Northern Arizona Lumberjacks football team was an American football team that represented Northern Arizona University (NAU) as a member of the Big Sky Conference (Big Sky) during the 2001 NCAA Division I-AA football season. In their fourth year under head coach Jerome Souers, the Lumberjacks compiled an 8–4 record (5–2 against conference opponents), outscored opponents by a total of 368 to 307, and tied for second place out of nine teams in the Big Sky.

For the third time in school history, the Lumberjacks qualified to play in the NCAA Division I-AA playoffs. They lost by a 34–31 score to Sam Houston State in the first round.

The team played its home games at the J. Lawrence Walkup Skydome, commonly known as the Walkup Skydome, in Flagstaff, Arizona.

The team's statistical leaders included Marcus King with 1,287 rushing yards (including 271 yards against Portland State and 248 yards against Eastern Washington) and Preston Parsons with 2,267 passing yards. Linebacker Keith O'Neil received first-team All-Big Sky honors and later played four years in the National Football League.

Schedule

References

Northern Arizona
Northern Arizona Lumberjacks football seasons
Northern Arizona Lumberjacks football